The Botez sisters are American chess players who are sisters:

 Alexandra Botez
 Andrea Botez